The PT. Indobuana Autoraya is a joint venture between Volvo Personvagnar AB and the Indomobil Group. 

The production of the company began with the CKD assembled models SsangYong Musso and SsangYong Rexton. In the late 2009 the company started its own manufacturing of the Volvo S80 and Volvo XC90.

In 2010 the Volvo C70, Volvo S60 and Volvo XC70 entered production. Other products for the local market from the company are the trucks Foton BJ1028 and Foton BJ1039.

External links
Official website of SsangYong in Indonesia
Official website of Volvo cars in Indonesia

Car manufacturers of Indonesia
Volvo Cars
SsangYong vehicles
Vehicle manufacturing companies established in 2009
Indonesian companies established in 2009
Multinational joint-venture companies

de:IndoMobil Group#Indobuana Autoraya, PT.